The province of Sassari is a province in the autonomous island region of Sardinia in Italy. Its capital is the city of Sassari. , the province had a population of 493,357 inhabitants.

History
In ancient times, between 1600 and 1500 BC, the Nuraghi civilization was at its peak in this area. During the Roman domination, the Logudoro region was one of the main grain suppliers of the Western Roman Empire, and was the seat of several legions. In the Middle Ages, the Logudoro region was the center of one of the four quasi-kingdoms in which Sardinia was divided, the Giudicato di Torres or Logoduro, the first capital being Ardara, later replaced by Sassari. The numerous countryside Romanesque basilicas date from this period. After the conquest by the House of Aragon, Logoduro declined, but later, under the House of Savoy rule as part of the Kingdom of Sardinia, it grew in significance. In the 20th century the construction of roads and railways brought more prosperity, but at the same time destroyed the large forest heritage of the region.

The Province of Sassari was founded in 1859, even before the unification of Italy in 1861, with an area which until 1927 included the entire head of the island, making it the largest province in the country at the time. The modern University of Sassari dates to around the same time that the province was created. Since 1878 the province has been administered from the Palazzo della Provincia in Sassari.

Geography
Facing the Sardinian Sea to the north and west and the Tyrrhenian Sea to the east, the Province of Sassari is bordered to the south by the provinces of Nuoro and Oristano. There are 92 municipalities (comuni) in the province, the largest of which are Sassari, Olbia, Alghero, Porto Torres, Tempio Pausania, Sorso, Ozieri, Ittiri and Sennori. Another town of note, Pattada, is particularly known for its handmade knives.

In the province is the only natural lake in Sardinia, Lake Baratz, and one of the largest artificial lakes, Lake Coghinas in the western part which (before the re-organization of Sardinian provinces) formed the boundary with the abolished province of Olbia-Tempio. In this territory is one of the largest plains in Sardinia, Nurra. The province contains some of the most famous resorts of Sardinia including Castelsardo, Porto Torres, Alghero, the Riviera del Corallo, Stintino and others. Stintino is located on the peninsula of the same name, running from the Nurra plain  to  the Asinara Island, part of the Asinara National Park. Among the notable beaches of the Province of Sassari is Balai in Porto Torres, Pelosa Beach in Stintino, and  others such as Alghero il Lido, Maria Pia, Bombarde, and Mugoni.  The inner part of the province in the traditional Logoduro region is characterized by a hilly and mountainous landscape, with soft volcanic terrains. The town of Ozieri is its most important center for culture and history away from the coast, noted for its production of tools and pottery from ancient times.

Administrative divisions
The province includes 92 comuni. The largest by population are Sassari (127,217 inhabitants), Olbia (60,181) and Alghero (43,945).

Government

List of presidents of the province of Sassari

References

External links

Official website

 
Sassari